Máximo González and Andrés Molteni defeated Juan Sebastián Cabal and Marcelo Melo in the final, 6–1, 7–6(7–3) to win the doubles tennis title at the 2023 Rio Open.

Simone Bolelli and Fabio Fognini were the defending champions, but lost in the first round to Sadio Doumbia and Fabien Reboul.

Seeds

Draw

Draw

Qualifying

Seeds

Qualifiers
  Nikola Ćaćić /  Andrea Pellegrino

Lucky losers
  Mateus Alves /  João Fonseca

Qualifying draw

References

External links
 Main draw
 Qualifying draw

Rio Open - Doubles
Rio Open